Rohit Thakur (born November 14, 2003) is an American soccer player who plays as a forward for North Carolina FC U23 in USL League Two.

Youth and College career
Thakur played for three years in the North Carolina FC academy system where he was named EECNL Mid-Atlantic Conference Best XI and Player of the Year.

He committed to the University of North Carolina at Chapel Hill to play college soccer for the men's soccer team.

Club career
In 2021, he signed an academy contract with the pro team in 2021. He signed a second academy contract in 2022. During the summers of 2021 and 2022, he played with their pre-professional side North Carolina FC U23 in the fourth tier USL League Two. He made his professional debut with North Carolina FC in USL League One on September 11 against New England Revolution II.

References

External links

2003 births
Living people
American soccer players
Association football forwards
USL League Two players
USL League One players
North Carolina FC players
North Carolina FC U23 players